The AIS-SART is a self-contained radio device used to locate a survival craft or distressed vessel by sending updated position reports using a standard Automatic Identification System (AIS) class-A position report. The position and time synchronization of the AIS-SART are derived from a built in GNSS receiver (e.g. GPS).
Shipboard Global Maritime Distress Safety System (GMDSS) installations include one or more search and rescue locating devices. These devices may be either an AIS-SART (AIS Search and Rescue Transmitter) (from January 1, 2010), or a radar-SART (Search and Rescue Transponder).

The AIS-SART derives position and time synchronization from a built in GNSS receiver. Once per minute, the position is sent as a series of eight identical position report messages (four on 161.975 MHz and four on 162.025 MHz). This scheme creates a high probability that at least one of the messages is sent on the highest point of a wave.

AIS SARTs are typically cylindrical and brightly colored. A typical model is 251mm (about 10 inches) high and weighs 450g (about a pound). 

The specification (IEC 61097-14 Ed 1.0) for AIS-SART was developed by the IEC's TC80 AIS work group. AIS-SART was added to the GMDSS regulations effective January 1, 2010.

See also

 Emergency Position-Indicating Radio Beacon (EPIRB)
 Civil Air Patrol (US Air Force Auxiliary)
 Long-Range Identification and Tracking (LRIT)
 Marine VHF radio
 Automatic Identification System
 Global Maritime Distress Safety System

References

Maritime communication
Emergency communication
Rescue equipment